Kenneth Karl Mikael Möllersten (born 6 November 1966) is a Swedish researcher. He holds a PhD in chemical engineering and an MSc in mechanical engineering, both from the Royal Institute of Technology (KTH), Stockholm, Sweden. Möllersten is a consultant and researcher at IVL Swedish Environmental Research Institute and is affiliated with Mälardalen University.

Möllersten was one of the originators of Bio-energy with carbon capture and storage (BECCS), a technology for negative emissions. His work in this area contributed to the original proposal for globally net-negative carbon dioxide emissions as a climate risk management strategy, in 2001, and he contributed to several of the initial studies that model the integration of carbon dioxide removal through BECCS in global greenhouse gas (GHG) abatement strategies. In 2002, Möllersten's PhD thesis, moreover, introduced the concept of "carbon-negative production", and proposed that it should be included in R&D portfolios as a means to expand available options for corporate carbon management. Subsequently, Möllersten  made further contributions to the early conceptual work on negative emission technologies (NETs) as one of the original proponents of the utilization of biochar for the combined carbon dioxide removal and soil enhancement.

Selected publications 
 Möllersten K, Yan J (2001). Economic evaluation of biomass-based energy systems with CO2 capture and sequestration in kraft pulp mills -The influence of the price of CO2 emission quota. World Resource Review 13 (4), 509-525.
 Obersteiner M, Azar Ch, Kauppi P, Möllersten K, Moreira J, Nilsson S, Read P, Riahi K, Schlamadinger B, Yamagata Y, Yan J, van Ypersele J-P (2001). Managing climate risk. Science 294 (5543):786-787.
Möllersten K (2002). Opportunities for CO2 reductions and CO2-lean energy systems in pulp and paper mills. Doctoral thesis, Royal Institute of Technology, Stockholm.
 Möllersten K, Yan J, Moreira JR (2003). Potential market niches for biomass energy with CO2 capture and storage - Opportunities for energy supply with negative CO2 emissions. Biomass and Bioenergy 25 (3):273-285.
 Möllersten K, Yan J, Westermark M (2003). Potential and cost-effectiveness of CO2 reductions through energy measures in Swedish pulp and paper mills. Energy 28 (7):691 - 710.
 Möllersten K, Chladná Z, Chladný M, Obersteiner M. Negative emission biomass technologies in an uncertain climate future. In: Warnmer S F (Ed) Progress in biomass and bioenergy research, pp. 53–100. Nova Science Publishers, Inc., NY, 2006. .
 Azar Ch, Lindgren K, Larson ED, Möllersten K (2006). Carbon capture and storage from fossil fuels and biomass – Costs and potential role in stabilising the atmosphere. Climatic Change 74 (1-3): 47–79.
 Azar Ch, Lindgren K, Obersteiner M, Riahi K, van Vuuren D, Michel K, den Elzen M, Möllersten K, Larson E (2010). The feasibility of low CO2 concentration targets and the role of bio-energy with carbon capture and storage (BECCS). Climatic Change 100(1):195-202.
 Möllersten K, Grönkvist S (2007). All CO2 is equal in the atmosphere – A comment on CDM GHG accounting standards for methane recovery and oxidation projects. Energy Policy 35 (7):3675–3680. 
 Möllersten K, Gao L, Yan J (2006). CO2 capture in pulp and paper mills: CO2 balances and preliminary cost assessment. Mitigation and Adaptation Strategies for Global Change 11 (5-6):1129-1150.
 Grönkvist S, Möllersten K, Pingoud K (2006). Equal opportunity for avoided CO2 emissions: a step towards more cost-effective climate change mitigation regimes. Mitigation and Adaptation Strategies for Global Change 11 (5-6): 1083-1096.
 Yan J, Obersteiner M, Möllersten K, Moreira J.R. (Editors) (2019). Special issue on Negative Emission Technologies. Applied Energy 255:1-3.
Zetterberg L, Johnsson F, & Möllersten K (2001). Incentivizing BECCS – a Swedish case study. Frontiers in Climate 3:685227.

References

External links 

 Kenneth Möllersten IVL Swedish Environmental Research Institute.
Profile at Research Gate
Google scholar entry
 Beyond emissions: The call to pull carbon out of the atmosphere Sydney Morning Herald, August 2021.

Swedish chemical engineers
KTH Royal Institute of Technology alumni
Living people
1966 births
Swedish mechanical engineers